Duékoué is a city in western Ivory Coast. It is a sub-prefecture of and the seat of Duékoué Department. It is also the seat of Guémon Region in Montagnes District and a commune. In the 2021 census, the population of the sub-prefecture of Duékoué was 220,953.

History
At least 800 people were killed in Duékoué on 29 March 2011 during fierce fighting during the 2010–11 Ivorian crisis.

Climate
The Köppen-Geiger climate classification system classifies its climate as tropical wet and dry (Aw).

Villages
The sixteen villages of the sub-prefecture of Duékoué and their population in 2014 are:

References

Sub-prefectures of Guémon
Communes of Guémon
Regional capitals of Ivory Coast